Stanley Herbert Hicks Pearce (21 September 1863 — 5 May 1929) was an English first-class cricketer.

The son of Henry Stanley Pearce, he was born at Totton in September 1863. He was educated at Winchester College, before matriculating to Jesus College, Cambridge. Pearce was commissioned into the British Army as a lieutenant in the Dorsetshire Regiment in April 1885, before resigning his commission in February 1886. Pearce made a single appearance in first-class cricket for Hampshire against Somerset at Taunton in 1885. Opening the batting twice in the match, he was dismissed in Hampshire's first innings for 18 runs by E. W. Bastard, while in their second innings he was dismissed without scoring by John Challen. Pearce died at Oswestry in May 1929 and was buried at Oswestry Cemetery.

References

External links

1863 births
1929 deaths
People from Totton and Eling
People educated at Winchester College
Alumni of Jesus College, Cambridge
English cricketers
Hampshire cricketers